Maria Kristina "Tina" Nordström Holmqvist (born 6 August 1973) is a Swedish celebrity chef and television personality from Helsingborg, Sweden. 

She hosted the second season of New Scandinavian Cooking on PBS stations on American television, replacing Andreas Viestad as host of the show; she was succeeded by Claus Meyer. She also appeared in a subsequent series featuring the same cast in rotation called "Perfect Day", produced by Tellusworks/Anagram Produktion and directed by Andreas Lindergard.

Besides the cookery show Mat ("Food"), which she made together with Tomas Tengby, she has written cookbooks—Tinas mat ("Tina's food"), Tina and Jättegott Tina ("Delicious, Tina").

Nordström won the Swedish Let's Dance television show in 2008. In 2009, she produced Tinas cookalong, with Gordon Ramsay as a guest cook.

From 2014, she is part of the jury in Sveriges yngsta mästerkock, the Swedish version of Masterchef Junior.

References

External links
New Scandinavian Cooking: New Scandinavian Cooking - Meet Tina Nordström  
Tina Nordström at the Internet Movie Database
See Tina's dance performance in the Swedish Let's dance 2008 television show, where she won. (Web page in Swedish).

Swedish food writers
Swedish television chefs
Swedish women television personalities
American women television personalities
Salespeople
American television chefs
1973 births
Living people
Dancing with the Stars winners
Infomercials
Women cookbook writers
American women chefs
21st-century Swedish women writers
21st-century American women writers